Halorientalis is a genus of archaea in the family of Haloarculaceae.

References

Archaea genera
Taxa described in 2011